The discography of the Irish rock band U2 consists of 14 studio albums, one live album, three compilation albums, 83 singles, and nine extended plays (EPs). The band formed at Mount Temple Comprehensive School in 1976 as teenagers. In 1979, the group issued their first release, the EP U2-3, which sold well in Ireland. The following year, the group signed to Island Records and released their debut album, Boy. It reached number 52 in the UK and number 63 in the US. They followed it up with the release of October (1981) and War (1983). War was a commercial success, becoming the band's first number-one album in the UK while reaching number 12 in the US. The album yielded the singles "Two Hearts Beat As One", "Sunday Bloody Sunday" and "New Year's Day", the latter two have since become among the band's most popular songs. On the subsequent War Tour, the group recorded the live album Under a Blood Red Sky and concert film U2 Live at Red Rocks, both of which sold well and helped establish them globally as a live act.

The band shifted towards a more ambient, abstract musical direction for The Unforgettable Fire (1984), their first collaboration with producers Brian Eno and Daniel Lanois. The album went to number one in the UK and produced the group's biggest hit to that point, the UK top-10 single "Pride (In the Name of Love)". The group's fifth album, The Joshua Tree (1987), made them international superstars and was a critical and commercial success, reaching number one in over 20 countries; it is one of the best-selling albums in the US (10 million copies shipped) and worldwide (25 million copies sold). It produced their only number-one singles in the US, "With or Without You" and "I Still Haven't Found What I'm Looking For". U2 followed this up with the 1988 release of Rattle and Hum, a double album and companion documentary film which documented their experiences with American roots music from the Joshua Tree Tour with a collection of new studio tracks, cover songs, and live recordings. The lead single "Desire" was the band's first number-one single in the UK. The album sold over 14 million copies, while the film grossed $8.6 million.

Facing a backlash from Rattle and Hum and creative stagnation, U2 reinvented themselves musically in the 1990s. The band's following album, Achtung Baby (1991), marked a dramatic shift towards alternative rock, industrial music, and electronic dance music. It debuted at number one in the US, eventually sold 18 million copies worldwide, and spawned five singles, including "One", "Mysterious Ways", and the UK number-one "The Fly". U2's follow up albums Zooropa and Pop continued the band's experimentation with alternative rock and electronic dance music, reaching number one worldwide but with reduced sales. U2 regained commercial favour with the release of All That You Can't Leave Behind in 2000, returning to a more mainstream sound. The album sold over 12 million copies and won seven Grammy Awards. It spawned several successful singles, including "Beautiful Day", "Walk On", "Elevation", and "Stuck in a Moment You Can't Get Out Of". The following album, How to Dismantle an Atomic Bomb (2004), was promoted with the popular lead single "Vertigo". The album was another commercial success and ultimately won all nine of its Grammy Award nominations. The group's twelfth album, No Line on the Horizon (2009), reached number one in 30 countries but its sales of 5 million were seen as a disappointment by the band, and it did not contain a hit single. Their 2014 album Songs of Innocence was released at no cost to over 500 million iTunes Store users but the pervasiveness of the promotion brought controversy; the album's sales and charting duration were among the weakest in the band's discography. In 2017, U2 released Songs of Experience and began the 2017 and 2019 Joshua Tree Tours to commemorate the 30th anniversary of The Joshua Tree.

U2 have sold 175 million records worldwide. With 52 million certified units by the RIAA, U2 rank as the 22nd-highest-selling music artist in the US. U2 have eight albums that have reached number one in the US, the third-most of any group.

Albums

Studio albums

Re-recording albums

Live albums

Compilation albums

Collaborations

Box sets

Subscriber-exclusive albums

Extended plays

Singles

1980s

1990s

2000s

2010s

2020s

Other charted songs

Other appearances

Studio appearances

Live, remixes, and guest appearances

Videography

Theatrically released films

Videos

Subscriber-exclusive videos

Music videos

Notes

References 
General

Specific

External links 

Discography
Discographies of Irish artists
Rock music group discographies
Alternative rock discographies